Sŏnbong Sports Club is a North Korean football club from Rasŏn, affiliated with the Worker-Peasant Red Guards. They play in the DPR Korea Premier Football League.
Their home ground is Rajin Stadium. Sonbong is a region in Rason called Sonbong County.

The Sŏnbong women's football team plays in the DPR Korea Women's League, since earning promotion from Division 2 at the end of 2014.

References

Football clubs in North Korea
Military association football clubs in North Korea